Mangelia vauquelini is a species of sea snail, a marine gastropod mollusk in the family Mangeliidae.

Description
The length of the shell varies between 9 mm and 15 mm.

The shell is pale yellowish or almost white. It shows distant strong ribs. The shoulder has brown dashes or spots, appearing on the ribs only. There is usually, on the body whorl a central line of spots, also on the ribs.

Distribution
This species occurs in European waters off Portugal and Spain and in the Mediterranean Sea off Apulia, Italy, and Greece
.

References

 Payraudeau B. C., 1826: Catalogue descriptif et méthodique des Annelides et des Mollusques de l'île de Corse; Paris, pp. 218 + 8 pl.
 Gofas, S.; Le Renard, J.; Bouchet, P. (2001). Mollusca, in: Costello, M.J. et al. (Ed.) (2001). European register of marine species: a check-list of the marine species in Europe and a bibliography of guides to their identification. Collection Patrimoines Naturels, 50: pp. 180–213

External links
  Tucker, J.K. 2004 Catalog of recent and fossil turrids (Mollusca: Gastropoda). Zootaxa 682:1–1295.
 
 MNHN, Paris: Mangelia vauquelini

vauquelini
Gastropods described in 1826